Nathaniel Stone Simpkins (Jan. 8, 1796 – June 18, 1887) was a bookseller, publisher, and legislator in Massachusetts in the 19th century. He ran a bookshop and circulating library in Boston ca.1820-1830. "In 1835 he established the Barnstable Journal [of Barnstable, Massachusetts], and in 1856 he established the Yarmouth Register" of Yarmouth, Massachusetts. Simpkins served as a "Representative to the General Court of Mass. in 1836, 1850 and 1851."

He married Eliza Jane Thacher (1803–1836) in ca.1824; and Mary Sears (b. 1807) in 1852. His parents were John Simpkins and Olive Stone of Brewster, Massachusetts. Siblings included Caroline Simpkins, Olive Simpkins (Mrs. John Capen), Elizabeth Simpkins (Mrs. George P. Bangs), John Simpkins, and Boston bookseller Samuel Grant Simpkins.

Suffolk Circulating Library
Among the titles available to subscribers of Simpkins' Suffolk Circulating Library in the early 1820s:

 Stephen Burroughs' Memoirs
 D. Campbell's Overland Journaey to India
 Richard Cumberland's Jew of Mogadore, a comic opera
 Daniel Drake's Picture of Cincinnati
 Evans' Pedestrious Tour of 4,000 miles in America
 Catherine Hutton's Welsh Mountaineer
 M. De Genlis' Zuma
 Isabella Kelly's Ruthinglenne
 Miss Leslie's Young Ladies' Mentor
 Marvellous Chronicle, or Magazine of Wonders
 Masonick Melodies
 Theodore Melville's White Knight
 Mirror of the Graces, Advice on Female Accomplishments
 Hannah More's Strictures on Education
 Amelia Opie's Simple Tales
 Paris Spectator, or the Customs of Parisians
 Park's Travels in the Interior of Africa
 Isaac Pocock's Libertine, an opera
 Polyanthos
 President's Tour through the United States
 T.S. Surr's Winter in London
 Symzonia, or a Voyage to the Internal World

References

Further reading

Published by N.S. Simpkins
 
 
 Ezra Shaw Goodwin. Alice Bradford, or, The birth day's experience of religion. Boston: N.S. Simpkins & Co., and Barnstable, Mass.: N.S. Simpkins, 1828 Google books
 Barnstable Journal and County Advertiser

External links

1796 births
1877 deaths
People from Brewster, Massachusetts
American publishers (people)
Members of the Massachusetts House of Representatives
19th-century American politicians
19th-century American businesspeople